Orange Village is a village in Cuyahoga County and an affluent eastern suburb of the Greater Cleveland  area in the US state of Ohio. The population was 3,323 at the 2010 census.

History
Orange Township was settled in 1815 and established as a township in 1820. As part of the settlement of the Connecticut Western Reserve, Serenus Bumett was the first settler in the township. The name "Orange" was chosen because several of the early settlers had migrated from Orange, Connecticut.  In 1831, Orange Township was the birthplace of President James A. Garfield. However, since then, Orange Township has been divided into five parts.  These are Orange Village, Hunting Valley, Moreland Hills, Pepper Pike and Woodmere. Garfield's birth and early childhood occurred in modern-day Moreland Hills.

Orange Village, the southwest quadrant of the original township, was incorporated as a village in 1929.

Geography
The affluent village is the home of the scenic Beechmont Country Club golf course.

Demographics

2010 census
As of the census of 2010, there were 3,323 people, 1,277 households, and 973 families living in the village. The racial makeup of the village was 77.1% White, 14.4% African American, 0.1% Native American, 5.7% Asian, 0.1% Pacific Islander, 0.7% from other races, and 1.9% from two or more races. Hispanic or Latino of any race were 1.6% of the population.

There were 1,277 households, of which 33.4% had children under the age of 18 living with them, 64.1% were married couples living together, 8.6% had a female householder with no husband present, 3.4% had a male householder with no wife present, and 23.8% were non-families. 21.4% of all households were made up of individuals, and 10.9% had someone living alone who was 65 years of age or older. The average household size was 2.59 and the average family size was 3.03.

The median age in the village was 46.8 years. 24.8% of residents were under the age of 18; 5.3% were between the ages of 18 and 24; 17.8% were from 25 to 44; 34.1% were from 45 to 64; and 18.1% were 65 years of age or older. The gender makeup of the village was 48.1% male and 51.9% female.

2000 census
As of the census of 2000, there were 3,236 people, 1,170 households, and 959 families living in the village. The population density was 851.4 people per square mile (328.8/km). There were 1,236 housing units at an average density of 325.2 per square mile (125.6/km). The racial makeup of the village was 81.46% White, 12.64% African American, 0.06% Native American, 4.20% Asian, 0.09% Pacific Islander, 0.25% from other races, and 1.30% from two or more races. Hispanic or Latino of any race were 0.71% of the population. 12.3% were of American, 9.1% Russian, 6.8% German, 6.4% Italian, 6.3% Hungarian, 5.7% English, and 1.1% Israeli ancestry according to Census 2000. 98.3% spoke English and 1.0% Hebrew as their first language.

There were 1,170 households, out of which 41.6% had children under the age of 18 living with them, 71.5% were married couples living together, 8.5% had a female householder with no husband present, and 18.0% were non-families. 16.3% of all households were made up of individuals, and 9.1% had someone living alone who was 65 years of age or older. The average household size was 2.75 and the average family size was 3.10.

In the village, the population was spread out, with 28.8% under the age of 18, 3.4% from 18 to 24, 21.8% from 25 to 44, 29.4% from 45 to 64, and 16.6% who were 65 years of age or older. The median age was 43 years. For every 100 females there were 97.1 males. For every 100 females age 18 and over, there were 89.9 males.

The median income for a household in the village was $89,660, and the median income for a family was $102,206. Males had a median income of $77,865 versus $37,667 for females. The per capita income for the village was $46,296. About 2.3% of families and 3.6% of the population were below the poverty line, including 5.2% of those under age 18 and 1.1% of those age 65 or over.

Schools
Orange Village is served by the Orange City School System.

References

External links
 Village website

Villages in Cuyahoga County, Ohio
Villages in Ohio
Populated places established in 1815
1815 establishments in Ohio